Sunderland is a city in Tyne and Wear, England.

Sunderland may also refer to:

Places

Canada
Sunderland, Ontario

United Kingdom
City of Sunderland, a metropolitan borough named after Sunderland, Tyne and Wear, comprising the city as well as neighbouring towns, Washington and Houghton-le-Spring
Sunderland, Cumbria
Sunderland, Lancashire, a village, also known as Sunderland Point
Sunderland Bridge, County Durham
North Sunderland, Northumberland
Sunderlandwick, East Riding of Yorkshire

United States
Sunderland, Maryland
Sunderland, Massachusetts
Sunderland, Portland, Oregon
Sunderland, Vermont

People
Abby Sunderland (born 1993), American sailor
Alan Sunderland (born 1953), former English football player
Byron Sunderland (1819–1901), American Presbyterian minister
Eliza Read Sunderland (1839–1910), American writer, educator, lecturer, women's rights advocate
Eric Sunderland (1930–2010), British anthropologist and academic 
Harry Sunderland (1889–1964), Australian rugby league writer and administrator
Heni Materoa Sunderland (1916–2008), Māori community leader in New Zealand
James Sunderland, protagonist in the video game Silent Hill 2
 Kendra Sunderland, a US pornography actress and webcam model
Margot Sunderland, English psychologist and popular book author
Paul Sunderland (born 1952), American sportscaster and member of the 1984 US Olympic gold medal volleyball team
Scott Sunderland (actor) (1883–1956), English actor
Scott Sunderland (road cyclist) (born 1966), Australian former road racing cyclist and coach
Scott Sunderland (track cyclist) (born 1988), Australian professional track cyclist
Zac Sunderland (born 1991), American sailor
Earl of Sunderland, several:
Emanuel Scrope, 1st Earl of Sunderland (first creation)
Henry Spencer, 1st Earl of Sunderland (second creation)
Robert Spencer, 2nd Earl of Sunderland
Charles Spencer, 3rd Earl of Sunderland
Robert Spencer, 4th Earl of Sunderland
Charles Spencer, 3rd Duke of Marlborough, 5th Earl of Sunderland

Transportation
HMS Sunderland, the name of three ships of the Royal Navy
, a coaster in service with Ross Line Ltd, 1958–68
Short Sunderland, a Second World War flying boat made by Short Brothers

Other
Sunderland (UK Parliament constituency), from 1832 to 1950
Sunderland A.F.C., a professional football team
Alice in Sunderland, a comics history by Bryan Talbot of the Sunderland area and its connections to Lewis Carroll
Sunderland A.F.C. Women, women's football team in the English city
University of Sunderland, university in the English city
Sunderland International Airshow, held in the English city
Sunderland Lustreware ceramic originating from the English city
ACG Sunderland School and College, a private school in Auckland, New Zealand